Pärnu Jalgpalliklubi, commonly known as PJK, or simply as Pärnu, is a football club, based in Pärnu, Estonia.

Founded in 1989, Pärnu JK is mostly known for its women's team (Pärnu JK women), who until 2019 competed in the Estonian top division Naiste Meistriliiga. Domestically, Pärnu won a record 13 Naiste Meistriliiga, 6 Estonian Women's Cup and 7 Estonian Women's Supercup trophies.

The club's men's team last played in the second division Esiliiga.

Players

Current squad

 ''As of 7 March, 2022.

Personnel

Current technical staff

Managerial history

Statistics

League and Cup

References

External links
Team info at Estonian Football Association

Sport in Pärnu
Association football clubs established in 1989
1989 establishments in Estonia
Football clubs in Estonia